Distortionmeter (or more precisely distortion factor meter) is an electronic measuring instrument which displays the amount of distortion added to the original signal by an electronic  circuit.

Harmonic distortion 

Harmonic distortion is equivalent to adding harmonics to a signal. When a purely sinusoidal signal is in this way, a series of harmonics is superimposed on the original signal, and can be detected with suitable equipment.
 
If the input is 

The normalized output is 

 

The value of Total Harmonics Distortion (THD) is defined as the ratio of the harmonics to the fundamental; 
 i.e.,

This ratio can be given in dB or in percentage.

The instrument 

A distortionmeter is actually a levelmeter with two switchable parallel circuits at the input. The first circuit measures the total signal at the output of a system. (For low distortion levels this will be almost equal to fundamental). That value is adjusted to read 100% or, equivalently, to 0 dB. The second circuit is a high pass filter which removes (as much as practical) the fundamental frequency.  This can be a notch filter, one which passes all but the fundamental, with negligible attenuation at other frequencies (including whatever harmonics might be present).  Alternatively, if the distortion products are at higher frequencies, a highpass filter can be used if its cutoff rate is sufficiently steep to not affect the expected distortion products.  The output of the filter is measured as a percentage of the fundamental, and the reported value will be the distortion value.

See also 

 Audio analyzer

References

 

Electronic test equipment
Broadcast engineering